Barbara Wiedemann (born October 30, 1945) is an American poet. She has published four books of poetry, besides a number of poems in literary journals. She is the author of one monograph and co-editor of two critical studies. She was formerly a professor of English literature at Auburn University at Montgomery.

Early life
Barbara Wiedemann was born on October 30, 1945, and grew up in upstate New York. She received her Ph.D. from the University of South Florida.

Poetry
Wiedemann has published poems in a number of journals, including Kaleidoscope, Kerf, Poetry Motel, and Acorn. Four of her collections were published by Finishing Line Press: Half-Life of Love (2008), Sometime in October (2013), Death of a Pope and Other Poems (2012), and Desert Meditations (2018).

Critical studies
Wiedemann has authored a critical study, Josephine Herbst's Short Fiction: A Window to Her Life and Times, on the work of Josephine Herbst, the radical American writer, and is the co-editor of two books, Short Fiction: A Critical Companion and "My Name Was Martha": A Renaissance Woman's Autobiographical Poem. The latter is the first edition of a 1632 autobiographical poem, 110 lines long, by Martha Moulsworth—one of the first such poems in English, which was included in the seventh edition of the Norton Anthology of English Literature.

Her essay on Hélène Cixous and Marguerite Duras, "The Search for an Authentic Voice: Hélène Cixous and Marguerite Duras", was reprinted in the collection Marguerite Duras Lives On.

Selected works

 (poetry).
 (monograph).
 (edited collection).
 (monograph).

References

External links

 Online edition, with minor revisions.

1945 births
Living people
Poets from New Jersey
University of South Florida alumni
Auburn University at Montgomery faculty
Poets from Alabama
American women poets
20th-century American poets
21st-century American poets
21st-century American women writers
20th-century American women writers
American women academics
Writers from Somerville, New Jersey